The Romania men's national handball team is governed by the Romanian Handball Federation and takes part in international handball competitions. Romania was for many decades the most successful nation in handball with 4 gold medal wins at the World Championships, they served as a model for the sport. However, Romania has failed to win a medal since 1990.

Competitive record
 Champions   Runners-up   Third Place   Fourth Place

Olympic Games

World Championship

European Championship

Current squad
This is the list of 19 players named for the 2024 European Men's Handball Championship play-off games against Austria and Ukraine

See also  
 Romania women's national handball team

References

External links

IHF profile

 

National team
Men's national handball teams
National sports teams of Romania